Shine a Light: Field Recordings from the Great American Railroad is a 2016 album of field recordings made by British singer Billy Bragg and American musician Joe Henry as they performed in waiting rooms and trackside at railway stations on a journey between Chicago and Los Angeles in March 2016. The project was conceived after Henry produced Bragg's thirteenth studio album Tooth & Nail at his home studio in South Pasadena. It was released on the Cooking Vinyl label on 23 September 2016. The project is named after a lyric in the traditional folk song "Midnight Special" (mistakenly credited to Lead Belly after a 1934 recording he made).

Recording
In March 2016, English singer-songwriter Billy Bragg and fellow troubadour and producer Joe Henry set off from Chicago's Union Station with the intention of "reconnect[ing] with the culture of American railroad travel and the music it inspired." They undertook a 2,700-mile, 65-hour train ride recording songs that ""reflect the railroad’s impact on the nation’s social and cultural life." Goebel Reeves's Hobo's Lullaby (well known from Woody Guthrie performances) was captured at an Amtrak station in Alpine, Texas; the folk ballad Railroad Bill at St Louis Gateway station, Lonesome Whistle by Hank Williams in a sleeping berth near Whistle Junction, Missouri.

A short documentary Shine a Light by director Ray Foley was made of the trip and streamed for free on the official website.

Track listing
All songs performed by Billy Bragg and Joe Henry; music composers are listed below.

 "Rock Island Line" (traditional, arranged by Billy Bragg and Joe Henry) – 2:55
 "The L&N Don't Stop Here Any More" (Jean Ritchie) – 4:29
 "Midnight Special" (Huddie Ledbetter) – 3:34
 "Railroad Bill" (traditional, arranged by Billy Bragg and Joe Henry) – 2:49
 "Lonesome Whistle" (Hank Williams; Jimmie Davis) – 2:53
 "KC Moan" (Tewee Blackman) – 2:40
 "Waiting for a Train" (Jimmie Rodgers) – 2:46
 "In the Pines" (traditional, arranged by Billy Bragg and Joe Henry) – 3:31
 "Gentle on My Mind" (John Hartford) – 3:39
 "Hobo's Lullaby" (Goebel Reeves) – 3:57
 "Railroading on the Great Divide" (Sara Carter) – 3:08
 "John Henry" (traditional, arranged by Billy Bragg and Joe Henry) – 2:42
 "Early Morning Rain" (Gordon Lightfoot) – 4:13

Personnel
 Billy Bragg – acoustic guitar, electric guitar, vocals
 Joe Henry – acoustic guitar, electric guitar, harmonica, vocals
 Ryan Freeland - engineer, mixing

References

External links 

 Official Shine A Light mini-site.
 Billy Bragg .
 Joe Henry official.

2017 albums
Billy Bragg albums
Joe Henry albums
Folk albums by American artists
Folk albums by English artists
Americana albums
Cooking Vinyl albums